Ricardo Lloyd Johnson Jr. (born August 3, 1988), also known as Ricky Blaze, is an American DJ, producer, singer, and songwriter.
He has done production work in the dancehall music space and the trancehall subgenre. He has produced and collaborated with Shaggy and Sean Paul, and has also worked with Vybz Kartel, Jim Jones, Maino, Kardinal Offishall, Jasmine Sullivan, Nicki Minaj, and Santigold.

Early life
Johnson was born in the East Flatbush section of New York City's, Borough of Brooklyn to Jamaican parents. He attended Humanities Preparatory Academy in New York City. His introduction to music came at the age of 10 when he grew fascinated with the discipline of DJing after watching a neighbor who held the profession of a DJ. This eventually lead to opportunities for Ricky to provide support and assistance to the neighborhood DJs by keeping the party going when they needed to step away, ultimately leading him to become a full-on DJ and promoter/organizer of parties and events by the age of 15.

While DJing, Ricky's interest in music production and songwriting began to develop, pushing him to develop his skills in this area. At the age of 17, Ricky officially made the transition from DJing to music production, singing, and songwriting.

He credits Reggae and R&B pioneers Dennis Brown, Peter Tosh, and Gloria Gaynor for his early musical influence.

Music career

2006-2010

Ricky achieved debut success as a music producer following his collaboration with Dancehall artist Ding Dong on the song "Bad Man Forward, Bad Man Pull Up".

In 2008, Ricky Blaze began work on his solo debut project which would produce the single "Cut Dem Off". It would be on-air New York radio DJ personality and Hip Hop pioneer, Mister Cee, that would be the first to play the single, ultimately leading to the song's success and Ricky's status as a capable songwriter and producer and creator of the Trancehall genre.

In 2009 Ricky worked with Chelley, producing and co-writing the dance-pop song "Took the Night". During this year Ricky would also find success with Major Lazer on their album release Guns Don't Kill People... Lazers Do, co-producing, writing, and vocalizing on the song "Keep It Goin’ Louder" featuring twin sister Billboard R&B duo, Nina Sky.
 
In 2010, Ricky Blaze collaborated with dancehall artist Gyptian to create "Hold You." This release achieved certified gold status by RIAA. During this year he also worked with R&B songstress Jazmine Sullivan, contributing to the “Luv Back” song off of her 2010 full-length studio project, Love Me Back.

2011-Present

In 2011, Ricky Blaze released a 6-song EP, My Name is Ricky Blaze. “Just You And I,” served as the project's lead single release. The project also included songs featuring Harlem rapper, producer, and Dipset founder, Jim Jones, and Toronto rapper and producer, Kardinal Offishall.

In 2012, Ricky worked with Atlantic Records recording artist, singer, songwriter and producer, Santigold. The collaboration produced a song entitled, “Disparate Youth” and would serve as the lead single off of Santigold's 2012 album, Master of My Make-Believe. The song would peak at #9 on Billboard's Bubbling Under Hot 100 singles chart.

In 2013, Ricky worked with Vybz Kartel to produce “Touch Ah Button;” a song off of the Kartel's 2013 release, Kartel Forever: Trilogy. This year he would also release The Maestro, a 15-track LP that featured New York rappers Jim Jones, Maino, and Talib Kweli. Additionally this year, he would be featured on Jim Jones’ “We Got It” off of the EP We Own the Night and also contribute to Grammy Award winning Dancehall artist Sean Paul’s full length album, Full Frequency, on the song "It’s Your Life".

In 2015 he would earn production credits on Kranium’s full length project, Rumors.
 
In January 2016, under his label/production company, FME Recordings, Ricky released a compilation album, Conquer The Moment. The release provided 12 tracks that were rich with the Dancehall and Reggae sound and included features with Grammy Award winning reggae artist - Shaggy, Kranium, Gyptian, Black Ryno, Tifa, Mr. Easy, and a host of others. The lead single off the project, "Apart", featuring R&B/soul newcomer and FME artist, Alexus Rose, gained popularity in London and France leading to a recording contract with historic Reggae record label, Island Records.

The FME artist roster currently consists of Ricky Blaze, Chelley, Alexus Rose, Ding Dong, Kranium, Mr. Easy, and Cecile.

Ricky Blaze is currently at work on Conquer the Moment 2. The lead single off of the upcoming project is "Like This", and features Sean Paul. The song has been mentioned by music media outlets Mass Appeal and Audiomack.

Over the years, The Fader magazine has covered Ricky Blaze's career in several editorials.

Discography

Singles
2007
"Cut Dem Off"
2008
18 Again
2009
"How Me Look"
2010
"I Feel Free"
2011
"Just You And I:
"Aye Yah"
"Love Right Now"
"Feel The Vibes"
"Feel Free"
2012
"Call On Me"
"Jump On 4"
"The Bass"
2013
"Kill Em"
"Blowing Stacks"
"Lightaz"
"Free Keef"
"Center Forward"
"Top Shottas"
2014
"Endless Summer (Feat. Kes The Band)
"Take Ya Money"
"All I Need"
"Sell Off"
2016
"Motive"
"Dance"
"Apart"
"Like This (Feat. Sean Paul)
"Overrated"
2018
"Slam!"
2019
"Explosions"
2020
"Swerve"

Studio albums
 My Name is Ricky Blaze - EP (2010)
 The Maestro (2013)
 Conquer the Moment (2016)
 X-Rated (2018)

Single release collaborations

Full length album collaborations

References

American hip hop DJs
Record producers from New York (state)
People from Flatbush, Brooklyn
Songwriters from New York (state)
1988 births
Living people
American musicians of Jamaican descent